Neptis claude, the large club sailer, is a butterfly in the family Nymphalidae. It is found in Nigeria (the Cross River loop) and western Cameroon. The habitat consists of primary forests.

References

Butterflies described in 2005
claude